Curio City is the fourth studio album by English singer-songwriter Charlie Winston. Released on 26 January 2015, the album peaked at number five in Wallonia and at number six on the French Albums Chart.

Track listing

Charts

Weekly charts

Year-end charts

Release history

References

2015 albums
Charlie Winston albums